Tổ tôm or Tụ tam bài (聚三牌) is a draw-and-discard card game played in Vietnam, usually by men. The game is often played at festivals. It is derived from the Chinese game of Khanhoo.

The game uses a type of Chinese money-suited pack consisting of 120 cards. The head and foot of the card give the rank and suit in Chinese characters. During French colonial rule, the Marseilles firm Camoin redesigned the deck to depict people wearing traditional Japanese costumes from the Edo period. There are three suits: Cash (文, Văn), Strings of Cash (索, Sách), and Myriads of Strings (萬, Vạn). Each suit is divided into ten ranks with the highest cards being the Half Cash, Zero String, and Old Man respectively. There are four copies of each card unlike its four-suited kin, Bài bất.

There are five players who each have to draw and discard to form a hand of twenty-one cards. Like Khanhoo, melds are divided into certain types: 
three or four identical cards
a run of three cards in the same suit
three cards of the same rank but each from a different suit

In addition, there are special melds:
1, 2, 3 Cash (not really special but traditionally listed as one)
9 Cash, 1 String, 1 Myriad
8 Cash, 2 Strings, 2 Myriad
7 Cash, 3 Strings, 3 Myriad
Zero String, 9 Strings, 9 Myriad
Zero String, 9 Strings, Old man
Half Cash, 8 Strings, 9 Myriad

References 

 
  

Vietnamese games
Vietnamese words and phrases
Rummy